Sivi 2 is a 2022 Indian Tamil-language horror thriller film directed by K. R. Senthil Nathan, as a prequel to his earlier film, Sivi (2007). The film stars Tej Charanraj, Swathisha, Yogi and Gayatri Rema in the lead roles. A remake of the Korean film Gonjiam: Haunted Asylum (2018), it was released on 22 July 2022.

Cast

Production
Production on the sequel to Sivi (2007) began in early 2021 with director Senthil Nathan and actor Yogi reuniting from the original through the use of computer graphics. The first look poster of the film was released in December 2021. Chaams, who played a small role in Sivi, plays a serious role for the first time in his career.

Reception
The film was released on 22 July 2022 across Tamil Nadu. K. R. Manigandan of IANS gave the film a positive review, noting "Director Senthil Nathan's Sivi 2 is a reasonably well made Tamil horror flick that manages to win your attention and retain it right till the end". The critic from Times of India gave the film a negative review noting the film "tries too hard to frighten viewers but only end up as a badly-made horror film with logical loopholes".

A critic from Maalai Malar criticised the film, mentioning it was "low on thrills".

References

External links

2022 films
2022 horror films
Indian horror films
2020s Tamil-language films
Indian horror film remakes